Kuchar (also Romanized as Kūchār; also known as Kūchār-e Kaltūnābād) is a village in Nosratabad Rural District, in the Central District of Alborz County, Qazvin Province, Iran. At the time of the 2006 census, its population was 552, in 132 families.

References 

Populated places in Alborz County